Selena: The Original Motion Picture Soundtrack is the soundtrack album to the film Selena, starring Jennifer Lopez and featuring unreleased songs by Selena, including "Where Did the Feeling Go?", "Only Love", "Is It the Beat?" and "Disco Medley". Although this is the official soundtrack of the film, it does not feature most of the songs heard throughout the film from artists like Depeche Mode, Guns N' Roses, John Waite and Yuri.

Track listing

Singles
"Where Did the Feeling Go?"
"Is It the Beat?"
"Disco Medley, Part 2" ("Last Dance"/"The Hustle"/"On the Radio")
"Viviras Selena"/"One More Time"

Charts

Weekly charts

Certifications and sales

References

1997 soundtrack albums
Selena compilation albums
Selena soundtracks
Albums produced by A.B. Quintanilla
EMI Records soundtracks
Musical film soundtracks
Drama film soundtracks
Biographical film soundtracks
Albums recorded at Q-Productions